Helena Wong Kar Mun (born 11 April 1988; simplified Chinese:黄嘉汶; pinyin: Huáng Jiāwèn) is a Singapore weightlifter. Wong competes in the female 53 kg weight class. She debuted at the 2010 Commonwealth Games which was held in Delhi in Oct 2010. She made history at the Games by becoming the first ever woman weightlifter to be selected by Singapore to take part in a major athletic event. She was placed 8th at the Games, her first international competition.

Early life and education
Wong is the elder of the two siblings in her family.  Wong attended Convent of the Holy Infant Jesus Toa Payoh School for her primary and secondary education. She was active in sports since young. She represented her school in judo and was a house captain in her upper secondary years.  In her late teens, Wong decided to specialise in sports and in 2005, she opted to study sports at Nanyang Polytechnic.

Wong continued her sports specialisation into her undergraduate studies by choosing to focus in sports despite her equally keen interest towards business and economics. She gave up offers to study business and economics in Singapore's local universities and ventured overseas to study sport science in England's Loughborough University in autumn 2008. Wong graduated in June/July 2011 with a bachelor's degree in Sports and Exercise Science from the School of Sport, Exercise and Health Sciences.

As of August 2012, Wong is a sports lecturer with the Institute of Technical Education (ITE). She was previously ITE's scholar under their Associate cum Scholarship Scheme.

Had wide support from her sister.

Sporting career
Wong took up weightlifting by chance. She joined the gym in her university to keep fit and to escape the cold of her hostel room.  Wong started off self-coaching from the internet and books from June 2009 to February 2010 after being introduced to the sport by UK Athletics strength and conditioning coach Thomas Yule.

She met Cyril Martin, a senior weightlifting coach with British Weightlifting (BWL) at the English Weightlifting Championships held at Lilleshall in February 2010 and started training under his guidance soon after at Atlas Workout Warehouse in Alfreton, Derbyshire. Wong credits Martin's tutelage for her selection by the Singapore National Olympic Council to represent Singapore at the 2010 Commonwealth Games within a year after getting into the sport. Wong "didn't really believe it" when Singapore National Olympic Council selected her to represent the sport and the country as she was just a beginner.

SNOC Secretary-General, Chris Chan remarked that, "We took note of [Wong's] steady improvement and thought she would benefit from this New Delhi outing. Her participation would also give weightlifting a welcome boost as the sport enjoys a revival in Singapore." Similarly, Tom Liaw, President of Singapore Weightlifting Federation believes that weightlifters like Wong are contributing to the revival of the sport in Singapore since it was last represented in the 1986 Commonwealth Games. Liaw believes that "participation in major competitions like the Commonwealth Games is the next step to raising the profile of [weightlifting]" in Singapore. Wong finished the Games with a total of 146 kg (Snatch:66 kg; Clean & Jerk:80 kg) "a commendable 8th" for her debut international outing.

In August 2011, Wong embarked on a 3-month training stint in Zhuhai Sport Institute in Zhuhai, China to better prepare her for the 26th SEA Games held in Jakarta and Palembang, Indonesia in November 2011. Wong was the only representative for weightlifting and the first Singapore women to compete in weightlifting in the biennial competition. Wong faced tough competitors in the 53 kg category, meeting Thailand's top lifter and the 2008 Olympic (53 kg) champion, Prapawadee Jaroenrattanatarkoon who won with a total of 205 kg. Wong finished sixth out of nine lifters, making a total of 153 kg (70 kg snatch, 83 kg clean-and-jerk). Wong had bettered her previous performance set at the 2010 Commonwealth Games by 7 kg.

She represented Singapore at the 2012 Summer Olympics, lifting 61 kg in the snatch and 73 kg in the clean and jerk for a total of 134 kg.  This meant she finished in 15th place.

Competitive results

References

External links
 
Official website of the Singapore National Olympic Council
Official website of Team Singapore, managed by the Singapore Sports Council
Official website of the Singapore Weightlifting Federation
Official website of the Institute of Technical Education
Official website of Loughborough University

1988 births
Living people
Nanyang Polytechnic alumni
Alumni of Loughborough University
Singaporean female weightlifters
Olympic weightlifters of Singapore
Singaporean people of Chinese descent
Weightlifters at the 2010 Commonwealth Games
Weightlifters at the 2012 Summer Olympics
Commonwealth Games competitors for Singapore